Adrian Roosevelt Mike (born 16 November 1973) is an English former professional footballer who played as a forward from 1992 to 2004.

He notably played in the Premier League for Manchester City, and in the Football League for Bury, Stockport County, Hartlepool United, Doncaster Rovers and Lincoln City. He also played in Sweden for Linköping and at Non-league level for Leek Town, Hednesford Town, Southport, Northwich Victoria, Stalybridge Celtic, Gainsborough Trinity, Droylsden and Mossley.

Club career

Manchester City
Mike was born in Manchester, Lancashire. He came through the youth ranks at Manchester City, and made his professional debut against Notts County on 25 April 1992, scoring his first goal in the following match against Oldham Athletic. Whilst at City he played in the Premier League before leaving the club in 1995. He played 16 times in the league, scoring twice. Whilst at Maine Road he was loaned out twice, to Bury and Linköping.

Later career
Mike went on to play in the Football League for Stockport County, Hartlepool United, Doncaster Rovers and Lincoln City, and in the IFA Premiership for Cliftonville. He also played non-League football for Leek Town, Hednesford Town, Southport, Northwich Victoria, Stalybridge Celtic, Gainsborough Trinity, Droylsden and Mossley.

International career
Mike played for England at schoolboy and youth international level.

Personal life
After retirement, he worked as a personal trainer 
before going to law school in 2011, and is now managing director at Falcona Private Jets in Manchester. His cousin is Leon Mike. He also has 2 children.Age 10 and 6.

References

External links

Since 1888 ... The Searchable Premiership and Football League Player Database (subscription required)
Unofficial Adie Mike Profile at The Forgotten Imp

1973 births
Living people
Footballers from Manchester
English footballers
England youth international footballers
Association football forwards
Manchester City F.C. players
Bury F.C. players
Stockport County F.C. players
Hartlepool United F.C. players
Doncaster Rovers F.C. players
Leek Town F.C. players
Hednesford Town F.C. players
Southport F.C. players
Northwich Victoria F.C. players
Stalybridge Celtic F.C. players
Lincoln City F.C. players
Gainsborough Trinity F.C. players
Cliftonville F.C. players
Droylsden F.C. players
Mossley A.F.C. players
Premier League players
English Football League players
NIFL Premiership players
People educated at Stretford Grammar School